Goich may refer to:

 Dan Goich (born 1944), a former professional American football player
 Wilma Goich (born 1945), Italian pop singer and television personality

See also 
Goichi